Mobbed is an American hidden camera reality television show based on the use of flash mobs as part of the spectacle for the delivery of an important personal message. The show, created by Howie Mandel, Darryl Trell, and Howard Kitrosser, aired on March 31, 2011, as a one-time special on Fox. It premiered as a series in November 2011. The show is hosted by Mandel and choreographed by Tabitha and Napoleon D'umo.

Premise
The premise of the show is to use hidden cameras and flash mobs as part of the delivery of an important personal message. Participants are those who would like to reveal something significant to a friend or loved one. This friend or loved one goes through moments of confusion while people around them break out into synchronized dance in front of their eyes. By the end of an episode, they have learned a secret that could be anything from a marriage proposal, news of a pregnancy, the return of a lost family member, or a moment of reconciliation.

History
Mobbed first aired on Fox on March 31, 2011, as a one-time television special following American Idol. After attracting 10.8 million viewers, Fox decided to order another eight episodes.

The second episode aired November 13, 2011, to less than half of its pilot's audience.  Four more episodes aired during 2012, two in January and two in February.

After various public announcements suggesting a return-to-air in July 2012, on November 15, 2012, FOX announced that new episodes would be aired in January 2013.

Episode guide

References

External links
Official site

2011 American television series debuts
2013 American television series endings
2010s American reality television series
American hidden camera television series
English-language television shows
Fox Broadcasting Company original programming
Television shows set in Los Angeles
Flash mob
Mass media about Internet culture